Hieromonk Roman (secular name Alexander Ivanovich Matyushin, ; born November 16, 1954, village Ryabchovsk, Trubchevsky District, Bryansk Oblast) is a Russian poet, singer-songwriter and hieromonk of the Russian Orthodox Church.

Alexander was born into a family of rural teachers. He graduated from the Philology Department at the University of Elista, then worked as a school teacher. In 1983 he was tonsured monk in the Pskov-Caves Monastery. In 1985, he was ordained. He served in the parishes of the Bryansk Oblast and in Kiev Pechersk Lavra.

Alexander began writing poetry in his youth.  He published 19 books of poetry. He joined the Writers Union of Russia. Songs with Roman's lyrics are performed by Jeanne Bichevskaya, Oleg Pogudin, Sergei Bezrukov, Elena Vaenga, Maxim Troshin and others. According to Bezrukov, Roman does not recognize copyright and allows free reuse of his work.

References

External links
 Hieromonk Roman - Songs of Russian Renaissance (audio records)
 , Poem and song by Hieromonk Roman (Matushin), performed by author.
 Songs by Zhanna Bichevskaya on poems by Hieromonk Roman, Songs of Hieromonk Roman and To Your Name, Lord
 Poetry by Hieromonk Roman
 Interview with Hieromonk Roman, 2004
  There is my Serbia, travel notes by Hieromonk Roman
 Songs and poetry by Hieromonk Roman, by I.B. Nichiporov
 The nation is a crowd without God by Alexander Kalinin

Poet priests
Russian singer-songwriters
Russian male poets
Christian poets
Russian monks
Living people
1954 births
Russian male singer-songwriters